Elizabeth Treadwell (born 1967) is an American poet. Her works include LILYFOIL + 3 (O Books, 2004), Chantry (Chax Press, 2004), Birds & Fancies (Shearsman Books, 2007), Wardolly (Chax Press, 2008), Virginia or the mud-flap girl (Dusie, 2012), and Posy: a charm almanack & atlas (Lark, 2015).

Life
Born in Oakland, California, Treadwell is a graduate of the Berkeley Unified School District, the University of California, Berkeley (B.A. in Native American Studies, 1991), and San Francisco State University (MFA in Creative Writing, 1997). From 2000 to 2007, she was director of Small Press Traffic Literary Arts Center at the California College of the Arts in San Francisco. She has also taught at the Oakland School for the Arts and curated Lark Readings at Studio Grand in Oakland.

Poetic style
Writing in Stride magazine, critic Nathan Thompson called hers "a difficult but deeply rewarding poetry. It has a precision and a tenderness all of its own." In Boog City, critic Maureen Thorson called Treadwell's "a feminine poetry, marvelous, tough, and unrelenting." Treadwell's work has also been reviewed in Rain Taxi, Jacket, The Believer (magazine), and elsewhere. Her work is discussed in The Boston Review May/June 2009 as part of "The New Thing: the object lessons of recent American poetry."

Selected works
Starlit, Chax Press forthcoming
Penny Marvel & the book of the city of selfys, Dusie Books, 2018
Posy: a charm almanack & atlas, Lark Books & Writing Studio, 2015
Virginia or the mud-flap girl, Dusie Books, 2012
Wardolly,  Chax Press, 2008
Birds & Fancies, Shearsman Books, 2007
The Graces (chapbook),  Dusie wee, 2006
Cornstarch Figurine, Dusie Books, 2006
LILYFOIL + 3, O Books, 2004
Chantry, Chax Press, 2004
LILYFOIL (or Boy & Girl Tramps of America) (chapbook), Duration Press, 2002
The Milk Bees (chapbook), Lucille Series, 2000
Eve Doe: Prior to Landscape (chapbook), a+bend press, 1999
Populace, Avec Books, 1999
The Erratix & Other Stories (chapbook), Texture Press, 1998
Eve Doe (becoming an epic poem) (chapbook), Double Lucy Books, 1997
Eleanor Ramsey: The Queen of Cups, Fourteen Hills Press, 1997

References

External links 
 Official website

1967 births
Living people
20th-century American poets
Feminist artists
American women poets
21st-century American poets
Berkeley High School (Berkeley, California) alumni
UC Berkeley College of Letters and Science alumni
San Francisco State University alumni
20th-century American women writers
21st-century American women writers
Chapbook writers